Rip off or rip-off may refer to:

 Ripoff, a bad financial transaction
 Confidence trick,  an attempt to defraud a person
 Rip Off (video game), 1980 arcade game
 Rip-Off (film), 1971 Canadian comedy
 The Rip-Off, 1980 film starring Lee Van Cleef
 "Rip Off", by Ryan Adams from the album Easy Tiger

See also 
 Rip-off Britain
 Rip Off Press
 Ripped Off (1972 film) Italian crime film
 Knockoffs, or fake goods
 Rip It Off (disambiguation)
 Rip (disambiguation)